The Straits – White Bay North is a defunct provincial electoral district for the House of Assembly of Newfoundland and Labrador, Canada. The district was known as Strait of Belle Isle prior to the 1996 election. In the 2007 redistribution, it added five per cent of St. Barbe. As of 2011, there are 6,851 eligible voters living within the district.

The main communities include St. Anthony, Conche, Roddickton, Griquet and Quirpon. District also includes communities of: Bide Arm, Big Brook, Cape Norman, Cook's Harbour, Croque, Eddie's Cove, Englee, Flower's Cove, Great Brehat, Green Island Brook, Green Island Cove, Goose Cove, Goose Cove East, Hay Cove, Lower Cove, Main Brook, Nameless Cove, Noddy Bay, North Boat Harbour, North East Crouse, Pine Cove, Raleigh, St. Anthony Bight, St. Carol's, St. Julien's, St. Lunaire-Griquet, Sandy Cove, Save Cove, Ship Cove-Cape Onion and Wild Bight.

The district was abolished in 2015 and replaced by St. Barbe-L'Anse aux Meadows.

Members of the House of Assembly
The district has elected the following Members of the House of Assembly

White Bay

Election results

|-
 
|NDP
|Christopher Mitchelmore
|align="right"|1,537
|align="right"|36.74
|align="right"|+28.81
|-

|-

|}

}

 
|NDP
|Dale Colbourne
|align="right"|321
|align="right"|7.93
|align="right"|+3.84
|}

 
|NDP
|Gerry Ryall
|align="right"|171
|align="right"|4.09
|align="right"|+2.53
|}

} 
|Independent
|Ford Mitchelmore
|align="right"|78
|align="right"|1.56
|align="right"|
|}

}

|Independent
|Ford Mitchelmore
|align="right"|160
|align="right"|
|align="right"|
 
|NDP
|Holly Patey
|align="right"|41
|align="right"|
|align="right"|
|}

|}

References

External links 
Website of the Newfoundland and Labrador House of Assembly

Newfoundland and Labrador provincial electoral districts